Pablo Nicolás Vergara (born 15 September 1988, in Neuquén) is an Argentine-Chilean football left back or left winger who plays for Lautaro de Buin in the Segunda División Profesional de Chile.

Career

Club career
Vergara made his professional debut for Banfield on 12 April 2008 in a 0-0 draw against Gimnasia y Esgrima de La Plata. In 2009, he was part of the squad that won the Argentine championship for the first time in the history of the club, clinching the Apertura 2009 championship on the final day of the season.

For the 2010–11 season, Vergara was loaned to Chacarita Juniors in the Argentine second division.

On second half 2021, he signed with Santiago Morning.

Honours
Banfield
Primera División Argentina: Apertura 2009

References

External links
 
 
 

1988 births
Living people
People from Neuquén
Argentine footballers
Argentine sportspeople of Chilean descent
Argentine emigrants to Chile
Naturalized citizens of Chile
Chilean footballers
Citizens of Chile through descent
Association football defenders
Association football midfielders
Club Atlético Banfield footballers
Chacarita Juniors footballers
San Martín de Tucumán footballers
Guillermo Brown de Puerto Madryn footballers
Unión La Calera footballers
Boca Unidos footballers
Club Almagro players
Club Cipolletti footballers
Unión San Felipe footballers
Cobreloa footballers
Santiago Morning footballers
Lautaro de Buin footballers
Argentine Primera División players
Chilean Primera División players
Primera B de Chile players
Primera Nacional players
Torneo Argentino A players
Segunda División Profesional de Chile players
Argentine expatriate footballers
Argentine expatriate sportspeople in Chile
Expatriate footballers in Chile